The 1947  New South Wales  state election  was held on 3 May 1947. The election was for all of the 90 seats in the  Legislative Assembly.

Issues
At the beginning of 1947, Labor had been in power for 6 years under the premiership of William McKell. The urban conservative parties, which had been in a state of disarray at the previous election in 1944 had been unified as the Liberal Party of Australia under the federal leadership of Robert Menzies. However, in New South Wales the state Liberals had lost their two most experienced and capable leaders, Reginald Weaver who had died in November 1945 and Alexander Mair who had resigned from parliament to unsuccessfully contest a NSW senate seat at the 1946 federal election. They had been led by Vernon Treatt since March 1946. In February 1947, 3 months before the election was due, McKell stunned most people in the Labor Party and general community by announcing that he would resign to take up the position of Governor-General. McKell's preference as a successor was his ally in the struggle against Jack Lang, Bob Heffron. However, revealing the residual influence of Lang, the caucus chose his preferred candidate, the Housing Minister, James McGirr. Both parties went to the election with untried leaders. However, residual respect for McKell, continuing economic growth, the popularity of the federal Labor government and the memory of the factional fights among the state's conservative politicians gave Labor a significant advantage in the campaign.

Key dates

Results

While Labor lost some of the traditionally conservative seats it had picked up at the 1944 election to the Liberal Party, the result of the election was a landslide victory for Labor. Many of the gains of the Liberal and Country parties were conservative members who had been elected as independents at the previous election. They had rejoined the parties when some degree of order had been restored:

{{Australian elections/Title row
| table style = float:right;clear:right;margin-left:1em;
| title        = New South Wales state election, 3 May 1947
| house        = Legislative Assembly
| series       = New South Wales state election
| back         = 1944
| forward      = 1950
| enrolled     = 1,852,787
| total_votes  = 1,621,257
| turnout %    = 94.61
| turnout chg  = +3.19
| informal     = 32,262
| informal %   = 1.99
| informal chg = −1.14
}}

|}

Retiring members

Seats changing party representation

Aftermath
McGirr, Treatt and Country Party Leader Michael Bruxner retained their leadership roles throughout the parliament.

There were 11 by-elections during the parliament with a net loss of 3 seats for Labor.

Notes

References

See also
Members of the New South Wales Legislative Assembly, 1947–1950
Candidates of the 1947 New South Wales state election

Elections in New South Wales
New South Wales state election, 1947
1940s in New South Wales
New South Wales state election, 1947